State Route 94 (SR 94) is a  state highway that serves as a connection between the towns of Ada and Orion, completely within southern Montgomery County.

Route description

SR 94 is located at an intersection with U.S. Route 331 (US 331) to the south of Ada. From this point, the highway travels in a southeasterly direction to Ramer. From Ramer, the highway travels in an easterly direction before moving in a more southeasterly direction via Dublin and Currys. It then reaches its eastern terminus, an intersection with US 231 northwest of Orion.

Major intersections

See also

References

External links

094
Transportation in Montgomery County, Alabama